The Krylatskoye Sports Complex Cycling Circuit is a cycling circuit constructed next to the velodrome used for the track cycling events for the 1980 Summer Olympics in Moscow.

References
1980 Summer Olympics official report. Volume 2. Part 1. pp. 102–3.

Venues of the 1980 Summer Olympics
Defunct sports venues in Russia
Sports venues built in the Soviet Union
Sports venues in Russia
Olympic cycling venues
Cycling in the Soviet Union